Westhoek (Dutch for "west corner") or Maritime Flanders is a region in Belgium and France and includes the following areas:
Belgian Westhoek including the West Flanders  of Diksmuide, Ypres, and Veurne including the cities of Veurne, Poperinge, Wervik, Ypres, De Panne, Langemark-Poelkapelle, Diksmuide and Koekelare.  However, the three Belgian coast municipalities of De Panne, Koksijde, and Nieuwpoort are frequently considered a separate region known as the Belgian or Flemish West Coast.

Outside Dutch-language sources, Westhoek sometimes refers only to French Westhoek.

French Westhoek

Geography
French Westhoek is the northern part of French Flanders, lying between the river Lys and the North Sea on the Franco-Belgian border.  It nearly corresponds with the Arrondissement of Dunkirk (the northwestern quarter of the Department of Nord) but with the some areas of the arrondissement falling outside Westhoek while some areas of traditional Westhoek lie in the neighbouring Department of Pas-de-Calais.

French Westhoek consists of three natural regions:

 Blootland (Dutch for "naked land") or the Maritime Plain (French: Plaine maritime) including Dunkirk, Bourbourg, Bergues, and Hondschoote
 Houtland (Dutch for "woodland"), including Wormhout, Cassel, Hazebrouck, and part of Bailleul
The Lys Valley (French: Vallée de la Lys or Plaine de la Lys; Dutch: Leiedal) including Merville, Steenwerck, and part of Bailleul

Language
The traditional language of French Westhoek is a Dutch dialect called West Flemish, the French subdialect of which is known as French Flemish. It was once the dominant language of the region, but a long-time policy of Francization, starting with the introduction of French as the language of education in 1853, has led to the replacement of Dutch with French in the region. Of the population of the approximately 380,000 inhabitants of French Westhoek, there are now between 10,000 and 20,000 daily speakers of West Flemish, many of whom live in the arrondissement and city of Dunkirk, and twice as many who occasionally use the dialect.  Flemish was recently recognised as a regional language of France but there are no bilingual street signs and French remains the only official language in the area.

The French Flemish dialect has had significant influence on local toponyms. For example, the French Westhoek towns of Robecq and Dunkirk are derived from the Flemish names of Robeke and Duinkerke.

Sources and references
Ethnologue Report for West Flemish
Flemish in France detailed overview

Geography of Nord (French department)
Geography of West Flanders
Regions of Flanders
Areas of Belgium
Geographical, historical and cultural regions of France
French Flanders